Anthony Luis Echemendía Orduña  (born September 10, 1999) is a Cuban freestyle and folkstyle wrestler who competes at 65 kilograms. In his native Cuba, Echemendia was a two-time Senior National medalist, a U23 National champion and a five-time age-group National champion (two titles as a junior and three as a cadet).

Early life and career in Cuba 
Echemendía was born in Cabaigúan in Cuba. He started training gymnastics when he was 4 years old but ended up leaving the sport at the age of 8, following his father and brother's steps to start wrestling instead. He attended and won his first Cadet National Tournament at the age of 12 in 2012 and won two more titles ('13 and '14) before bumping up to the junior division. Despite a runner–up finish at the '15 Junior Nationals, Echemendia racked up the '16 title and in 2017 he placed at the Senior Nationals, won a U23 National title and also claimed his last age–group National championship. In 2018, he reached the finals of the Senior National Tournament and then, while preparing for the Junior Nationals and Pan-American Championships with the Cuban Junior Pan American team in Guatemala, Echemendía defected from Cuba, sneaking away from his coaches and teammates to cross Guatemala, Belize and Mexico and finally get to the United States late in the year.

Folkstyle career

High school 
When Echemendía arrived to Tucson, Arizona in late 2018, he was able to attend Sunnyside High School as a senior for one semester with the help of one of his Cuban coaches' friend Fernando Villaescusa. He started competing in folkstyle shortly after the arrival and dominated on his way to a Division II state title at 152 pounds compiling an unbeaten record of 26 wins and no losses. He graduated as a 2018–19 student.

College 
After winning the US Freestyle Junior Nationals in 2019, Echemendía received multiple NCAA Division I offers. In September, he announced that he had committed to the Iowa State Cyclones. However, it was later reported that he hadn't signed an NLI and a whirlwind recruitment started after that. He then visited the Ohio State University, the Arizona State University and finally the University of Iowa. He ended up officially committing to the Ohio State Buckeyes.

2020-21 
Echemendía was defeated by his teammate and four–time OHSAA state champion Dylan D'Emilio at the OSU wrestle-offs on January 9. However, the starting spot went back–and–forth through the regular season. Echemendía held a 4–1 record, with his lone loss coming in hands of the top–ranked Jaydin Eierman from Iowa. In February, Tom Ryan expressed he was leaning towards starting D'Emilio due to an injury Echemendía had suffered in the Eierman match. In March, it was announced that D'Emilio had been chosen as the starter for the post-season.

2021–2022 
Echemendía returned to collegiate wrestling and competed for the starter spot at the OSU's wrestle-offs on October 28, losing to eventual winner of the spot Jordan Decatur. He has gone 2–0 in competition since.

Freestyle career

Age–group level

2019 
In April, Echemendia competed at the junior level US Open at 65 kilograms. He defeated two opponents on points before injury defaulting out of the tournament. While it is not confirmed why he did so, he affirms that he was kicked out due to legal issues with his ID and that it had nothing to do with his health.

A few weeks later, Echemendía participated and won the AZ freestyle tournament, which qualified him for the USA Wrestling Nationals (Fargo Nationals).

In July, he completely dominated Fargo in both international styles at 145 pounds. In freestyle, he won by technical fall in his first five matches and won by points in the semis and finals, claiming the championship. In Greco-Roman, he teched everyone on his way to the quarterfinals, where he won by points and same in the semifinals. In the finals, he once again teched his opponent to crown himself as a National double-champion. This accomplishment made him a sensation across the United States.

In October, he competed at 65 kilograms and faced three-time MSHSAA champion Josh Saunders at Who's Number One. He stopped Saunders with a 10-0 technical fall.

Senior level

2020 
After more than a year without stepping into the mats, Echemendia wrestled veteran Evan Henderson on November 14, as the co-main event of FloWrestling: Burroughs vs. Valencia. This marked Echemendia's debut as a senior in the United States. He lost the match on points.

Echemendia represented the Ohio RTC at 65 kilograms in the FloWrestling: RTC Cup during December 4–5, alongside his teammate Sammy Sasso. In the opening dual against the NJRTC, he faced '17 World Championship runner-up James Green. After riding criteria at 4-4 in a near-upset, he was taken down and exposed multiple times with a lace in the last seconds of the match, the scoring ending up at 4–14. After initial refusal to roll with the laces, Echemendia suffered an injury due to the tightness of the technique and was unable to compete in the next matches.

Controversies

Altercation with his wife 
On November 10, 2021, it was announced that Echemendía had been arrested due to an altercation with his wife, Lily Echemendía, in which he reportedly grabbed her by the neck with both hands until rendering her unconscious, leading to him being charged with felonious assault.

Personal life 
Echemendía's story from Cuba has been featured in multiple documentaries, such as the FloSports' "The Crossing: The Anthony Echemendia Story" and the Big Ten Network's "From Cuba to Columbus: Anthony Echemendia's Journey to the Buckeyes". Since defecting from Cuba in 2018, Echemendía, who is close to his family, has not been able to see them since he cannot return to his home country, and during the release of the FloFilm, he expressed;

Freestyle record

! colspan="7"| Freestyle matches (doesn't include matches he had while in Cuba)
|-
!  Res.
!  Record
!  Opponent
!  Score
!  Date
!  Event
!  Location
|-
! style=background:white colspan=7 |
|-
|Loss
|0–2
|align=left| James Green
|style="font-size:88%"|TF 4–14
|style="font-size:88%" |December 4, 2020
|style="font-size:88%" |FloWrestling RTC Cup
|style="text-align:left;font-size:88%;" rowspan=2|
 Austin, Texas
|-
|Loss
|0–1
|align=left| Evan Henderson
|style="font-size:88%"|3–8
|style="font-size:88%"|November 14, 2020
|style="font-size:88%"|FloWrestling: Burroughs vs. Valencia
|-

NCAA record 

! colspan="8"| NCAA Division I Record
|-
!  Res.
!  Record
!  Opponent
!  Score
!  Date
!  Event
|-
! style=background:lighgrey colspan=6 |Start of 2021-2022 Season (sophomore year)
|-
! style=background:lighgrey colspan=6 |End of 2020-2021 Season (freshman year)
|-
|Loss
|4–1
|align=left| Jaydin Eierman
|style="font-size:88%"|Fall
|style="font-size:88%"|February 7, 2021
|style="font-size:88%"|Iowa - Ohio State Dual
|-
|Win
|4–0
|align=left| Danny Bertoni
|style="font-size:88%"|8–6
|style="font-size:88%"|January 31, 2021
|style="font-size:88%"|Ohio State - Maryland Dual
|-
|Win
|3–0
|align=left| Jake Spiess
|style="font-size:88%"|6–3
|style="font-size:88%"|January 29, 2021
|style="font-size:88%"|Michigan State - Ohio State Dual
|-
|Win
|2–0
|align=left| Dominic Dentino
|style="font-size:88%"|11–5
|style="font-size:88%" rowspan=2|January 17, 2021
|style="font-size:88%"|Ohio State Wisconsin Extra
|-
|Win
|1–0
|align=left| Trey Escobar
|style="font-size:88%"|11–7
|style="font-size:88%"|Ohio State - Wisconsin Dual
|-
! style=background:lighgrey colspan=6 |Start of 2020-2021 Season (freshman year)

Stats 

!  Season
!  Year
!  School
!  Rank
!  Weigh Class
!  Record
!  Win
!  Bonus
|-
|2021
|Freshman
||Ohio State University
|NR (DNQ)
|141
|4–1
|80.00%
|.00%
|-
|colspan=5 bgcolor="LIGHTGREY"|Career
|bgcolor="LIGHTGREY"|4–1
|bgcolor="LIGHTGREY"|80.00%
|bgcolor="LIGHTGREY"|.00%

References

Cuban male sport wrestlers
1999 births
Living people
Ohio State Buckeyes wrestlers
People from Sancti Spíritus Province